Theodore Cook may refer to:

Theodore Andrea Cook (1867–1928), British art critic and writer
Ted Cook (American football) (1922–2006), U.S. football player

See also
Ted Cook (disambiguation)
Ted Cooke-Yarborough (1918–2013), designer of the Harwell Dekatron and radar pioneer